The Have Nots are a Ska punk band from Boston, Massachusetts, consisting of  Jon Cauztik (guitar, vocals), Matt Pruitt (guitar, vocals), Jameson Hollis (bass), and Steve Patton (drums).

History
The band was formed in 2006, combining members of local bands Chicago Typewriter and Stray Bullets. Before ever releasing an album they played shows with  Boston ska legends such as The Mighty Mighty Bosstones and Big D and The Kids Table.

The band originally released a demo before recording their full-length debut album, 2009's Serf City USA. Initially a self-release, the album caught the attention of Vinnie Fiorello of Paper + Plastick Records, after Steve Foote of Big D and The Kids Table gave him a copy of it. Paper + Plastick put out cd and vinyl versions of the album, while the band offered free copies of it in the form of an mp3 download.

After the album was released the band was selected to play in that year's WBCN Rock & Roll Rumble, and went on  tours with the Dropkick Murphys, Anti-Flag, Street Dogs, and Swingin Utters. In fall of 2010 they did their own tour of Europe.

In May 2011, the band released their second album Proud. The album was produced by Teen Idols drummer Matt Drastic, and engineered by Descendents guitarist Stephen Egerton.

In 2013, Matt Pruitt became the new guitarist for Street Dogs.

Discography
Serf City USA (2009) (Paper + Plastick)
Proud (2011) (Paper + Plastick)

Videography
 One in Four (2009)
 Poisoned Antidote (2010)
 Used to Be (2010)
 Louisville Slugger (2011)
 Proud (2011)

References 

American ska punk musical groups
Musical groups from Boston